Hypotrachyna paracitrella is a species of foliose lichen in the family Parmeliaceae. Found in Ecuador, it was described as new to science in 2011.

References

paracitrella
Lichen species
Lichens described in 2011
Lichens of Ecuador
Taxa named by Harrie Sipman